Lesun (meaning leshy, a human-like spirit of the forests) is a gender-neutral Slavic surname. It may refer to:
 Aleksander Lesun (born 1988), Belarusian-Russian modern pentathlete
 Anatoly Lesun (born 1959), Russian politician
 Gennady Lesun (born 1966), Belarusian football player

See also
 

Belarusian-language surnames